Garibaldi is a hamlet in the Salto Department of Uruguay, not far from San Antonio. 

The town had a population of 354 in 2011.

References 

Populated places in the Salto Department